Scopula conduplicata is a moth of the family Geometridae. It was described by Warren in 1904. It is endemic to Bolivia.

References

Endemic fauna of Bolivia
Moths described in 1904
conduplicata
Moths of South America
Taxa named by William Warren (entomologist)